Carlos Enrique Peña Aldana (born January 9, 1988) is a Guatemalan singer and songwriter. He is the winner of the second season of Latin American Idol.

Biography 
Son of Hugo Peña and Nilsa Aldana de Peña. When he was young, he participated in tennis tournaments in Guatemala City, and joined the CSD Municipal's lower divisions football team.  He was introduced to singing through his older brother Hugo (who lives in the USA), who took him to karaoke clubs in Los Angeles. 

He participated in the first season of Latin American Idol (2006), but did not pass the theater round.  During the second season of Latin American Idol, he competed in the final round of Latin American Idol against Ricardo Caballero from Mexico, singing 3 songs.

His first solo CD, called “Con una Canción,” was released in December 2007 through Sony BMG It includes a song with the same title and other songs he performed in Latin American Idol; it was produced by the Mexican producer Fernando Chavez "Fech."

In 2010, he released the album Despierta, with his alternative rock band PENYA on the indie label The Sixth House/Mutual Sense Music. It was produced by his brother, Hugo Peña Jr.

Activism and Philanthropy 
Carlos Peña is an activist against the children’s Down Syndrome in Guatemala, and lends his celebrity to support a variety of causes for Guatemala.

Awards and honors
He won the 2007 Latin American Idol competition.

His first album was certified double platinum in Central America. 

In 2007, he received the honorific title of "Ambassador of the Peace” from the Guatemalan government.

He was invited to perform at one of the many Balls celebrating President Barack Obama’s Inauguration.  He was originally scheduled to perform at the Urban Ball hosted by the American Music Inaguraual ball Committee, but when that got canceled he performed instead at the 2009 Red White & Blue USO  Hero Ball, alongside George Clinton and Peter Paul & Mary. He was the only Central American performer invited to perform at one of the Inaugural Balls.

Latin American Idol Performances/Results

Discography
2010: Despierta (with PENYA)
2009: Aquí estoy
2007: Con Una Canción

References

External links
 Carlos Peña & Penya Music Official Site
 Official Carlos Peña's YouTube Channel

1988 births
People from Guatemala City
Guatemalan male singer-songwriters
Latin American Idol participants
Idols (TV series) winners
Living people